Spornovo is the name of several rural localities in Russia.

Modern localities
Spornovo, Vladimir Oblast, a village in Alexandrovsky District of Vladimir Oblast

Abolished localities
Spornovo, Kostroma Oblast, a village in Shirsky Selsoviet of Parfenyevsky District in Kostroma Oblast; abolished on October 18, 2004

References

Notes

Sources